Eric Wood (born 1986) is a former American football center.

Eric Wood may also refer to:
Eric Fisher Wood (1888–1962), American engineer and co-founder of the American Legion
Eric Franklin Wood (1947–2021), Canadian-American hydrologist 
Eric Wood (baseball) (born 1992), Canadian baseball player
Eric Wood (footballer) (1920–2000), English footballer

See also
Eric McWoods (born 1995), American soccer player
Eric Woods (1892–1936), Australian rules footballer